Langfossen is a waterfall located in Etne Municipality in Vestland county, Norway. The water falls down a towering mountain, a total distance of about  before the water leaps out into Åkrafjorden at the base of the mountain. European route E134 runs along the base of the waterfall, making access very easy. 

The World Waterfall Database declared this waterfall to be one of the "best in the world". In March 2011 CNN/Budget Travel sat Langfossen as one of the worlds ten most beautiful waterfalls.  The waterfall is one of the few in Norway that has not been used in hydroelectric power generation, so it is still in its natural state.

Gallery

See also
List of waterfalls#Norway

References

Etne
Waterfalls of Vestland